Elke Tindemans (born 1961) is a Belgian politician and a member of the CD&V. She was elected as a member of the Belgian Senate in 2007.

Notes

References

Living people
Christian Democratic and Flemish politicians
Members of the Belgian Federal Parliament
1961 births
People from Berchem